Chapmannia is a genus of flowering plants in the family Fabaceae, and was recently assigned to the informal monophyletic Pterocarpus clade of the Dalbergieae.

Species
Chapmannia comprises the following species:
 Chapmannia floridana Torr. & A. Gray
 Chapmannia gracilis (Balf. f.) Thulin
 Chapmannia prismatica (Sessé & Moc.) Thulin
 Chapmannia reghidensis Thulin
 Chapmannia sericea Thulin
 Chapmannia somalensis (Hillc. & J.B. Gillett) Thulin
 Chapmannia tinireana Thulin

References

Dalbergieae
Fabaceae genera
Taxonomy articles created by Polbot